Robert Bonner, LL.B. (September 10, 1920 – August 12, 2005) was a Canadian lawyer, politician, and corporate executive.  He pursued his career working in the British Columbia government and in B.C.-based companies.

Bonner was born and raised in Vancouver, and served with the Seaforth Highlanders in Italy in the Second World War.  Upon his return to Canada, Bonner took a law degree from the University of British Columbia in 1948, and joined a practice in Vancouver.  Active in politics from an early age, Bonner became a supporter and confidant of W.A.C. Bennett, who would go on to lead the Social Credit Party to victory in the 1952 provincial election.  To the surprise of many, Bennett appointed the unelected, 32 year-old Bonner as the province's Attorney General — the youngest in B.C.'s history.  Bonner would be elected to represent the riding of Vancouver-Point Grey in the provincial election of 1953, which was also the first Social Credit majority government in the province. He would retain the position of Attorney General for the next sixteen years, quickly becoming one of the most powerful ministers and closest advisors to Bennett in the Socreds' long spell of governance.

Bonner's tenure as Attorney General was marked by legal clashes with First Nations tribes over land and resource rights, especially in light of the rapid hydroelectric, mining, and forestry development of the province's hinterland.  Perhaps more significantly, from a historical perspective, was the provincial government's conflicts with the Freedomites (Sons of Freedom), an anti-government religious group resident in the Kootenay region of the province.  Clashes over public education led to the apprehension en masse of Freedomite children, and their confinement in a government boarding school.

During his time in cabinet, Bonner also served at various times concurrently as Minister of Education and Minister of Trade and Commerce.  In the legislature, Bonner proved capable, serving as Bennett's House Leader.  Contemporaries described him as "articulate, urbane, and always well prepared, with a demonstrated air of superiority and a ready laugh."

Bonner left provincial politics in 1968 to become vice-president of MacMillan Bloedel, a Vancouver-based logging and lumber company.  He would later go on to become the firm's president and chief executive officer.  Bonner left Mac Blo in 1976 to become chairman of BC Hydro, the provincial crown corporation responsible for producing and supplying hydroelectric power.  He retired from that position in 1985.

Bonner died in Vancouver in 2005.

Cabinet Positions

References
Encyclopedia of British Columbia.  Vancouver:Harbour Publishing, 2001.
David Mitchell, "The Good Old Days? W. A. C. Bennett and the Legislative Assembly", in the Canadian Parliamentary Review, vol. 6, 1983.

1920 births
2005 deaths
Attorneys General of British Columbia
British Army personnel of World War II
British Columbia Social Credit Party MLAs
Businesspeople from Vancouver
Members of the Executive Council of British Columbia
Peter A. Allard School of Law alumni
Politicians from Vancouver
Lawyers in British Columbia
20th-century Canadian legislators
20th-century Canadian businesspeople
Canadian expatriates in Italy